Bozveshk (also Romanized as Bozūshk and Bozwshk; also known as Bozvīshk and Ribāt-i-Bizdkush) is a village in Sarjam Rural District, Ahmadabad District, Mashhad County, Razavi Khorasan Province, Iran. At the 2006 census, its population was 461, in 131 families.

References 

Populated places in Mashhad County